Jenna Thiam (born 19 December 1990) is a Belgian actress. She is known for the French series The Returned.

Early life 
Thiam was born in Brussels. She wanted to be an actress from the age of four. She took a course in acting in New York at the Lee Strasberg Theatre & Film Institute, staying only two months of a year-long course.

Her mother is half-Armenian and half-Belgian. Her father is half-Senegalese, one-quarter English and one-quarter French; he was born in Dakar. Her father is a percussionist and once toured with Nina Simone. Her mother worked as an agent in Paris and Brussels for small fashion brands. She has one younger brother. Thiam modelled from the age of 4 and throughout her childhood and adolescence. She lived in the Paris neighbourhood, Montmartre with her English grandmother, cousin, and family. Later, she was a student at the drama school, Cours Florent.

Career 
She started modelling for a clothing company before she left her career in fashion to become an actress. She was studying at  National Conservatory of Dramatic Arts of Paris, when she was cast in The Returned. The French edition of Grazia reported that she rejected a role in Pirates of the Caribbean: Dead Men Tell No Tales to complete her studies. She has also appeared in the French film Salaud, on t'aime.

Personal life
Thiam married Portuguese singer Salvador Sobral in a small ceremony in Lisbon on 29 December 2018.

Filmography

Theatre

References

External links 
 

1990 births
Living people
Actresses from Brussels
Belgian film actresses
Belgian stage actresses
Belgian television actresses
Belgian expatriates in France
Belgian people of Senegalese descent
Belgian people of English descent
Belgian people of French descent
Belgian people of Armenian descent